Luay Hamza Abbas (born 1965) is an Iraqi writer. He now teaches literary criticism at Basra University. Abbas has published several volumes of short stories  and one novel.

In 2010, the National Endowment of the Arts awarded a grant to academic and translator Yasmeen Hanoosh to translate Abbas' short story collection Closing His Eyes (2008). The title story of this volume was translated earlier in Banipal 27 and also won the 2006 Kikah Best Short Story Award in London.

References

People from Basra
Living people
1965 births
University of Basrah alumni
Iraqi short story writers
20th-century Iraqi novelists
21st-century Iraqi novelists